Bloque de búsqueda (English: Search Bloc), is a Colombian telenovela produced by Sony Pictures Television for RCN Televisión. The telenovela is based on the life of Hernán Martín and Antonio Gavilán, who created the group Bloque de búsqueda to capture of Pablo Escobar.

Plot 
"Bloque de búsqueda" tells the untold story of Coronel Hernán Martín and Capitán Antonio Gavilán, the men who created and commanded the elite police corps, responsible for tracking and killing Pablo Escobar. Not having all the resources needed Gavilán and Martín resort to all sorts of strategies  at the edge of legality.  At time allying with enemies and putting their lives and their families at risk in order to bring the most ruthless and elusive criminal in Colombia to justice.

Cast 
Rafael Novoa as Hernán Martín 
Sebastián Martínez as Capitán Gavilán
Carolina Gómez as Milena de Martín
Verónica Orozco as Ana María de Gavilán
Bryan Moreno as Hernán Martín Jr
Laura Londoño as Olga Diez

References 

Spanish-language telenovelas
Colombian telenovelas
RCN Televisión telenovelas
2016 Colombian television series debuts
2016 Colombian television series endings
2016 telenovelas
Television shows set in Bogotá
Sony Pictures Television telenovelas